Diamond Handcuffs is a 1928 American drama silent film directed by John P. McCarthy and written by Joseph Farnham, Willis Goldbeck and Bradley King. The film stars Eleanor Boardman, Lawrence Gray, Sam Hardy, Gwen Lee and Lena Malena. The film was released on May 5, 1928, by Metro-Goldwyn-Mayer.

Cast 
Eleanor Boardman as Tillie
Lawrence Gray as Larry
Sam Hardy as Spike
Gwen Lee as Cecile
Lena Malena as Musa
Conrad Nagel as John
John Roche as Jerry Fontaine
Charles Stevens as Niambo

References

External links 
 
 
 Lobby card

1928 films
1920s English-language films
Silent American drama films
1928 drama films
Metro-Goldwyn-Mayer films
American black-and-white films
American silent feature films
Films directed by John P. McCarthy
1920s American films